Anucha Suksai (born April 10, 1992), is a Thai professional footballer who plays as a midfielder for Thai League 2 club Rayong.

External links

1992 births
Living people
Anucha Suksai
Association football midfielders
Anucha Suksai
Anucha Suksai